André Couder (27 November 1897 – 16 January 1979) was a French optician and astronomer.

Information
From 1925, he worked in the optics laboratory of the Paris Observatory. Between 1952 and 1958 he was vice-president of the International Astronomical Union. A lunar crater, Couder, is named for him. He was awarded the Valz Prize in 1936, and the Janssen Medal from the French Academy of Sciences in 1952.

Couder was the President of the Société astronomique de France (SAF), the French astronomical society, from 1955-1957.

References

1897 births
1979 deaths
20th-century French astronomers
Members of the French Academy of Sciences
People from Alençon
Opticians